Höllbach may refer to:

 Höllbach (Schwesnitz), a river of Bavaria, Germany
 Höllbach (Tiefenbach), a river of Baden-Württemberg, Germany

See also 
 Höllbachgspreng